Storming of the Macedonian Parliament, also known as Bloody Thursday occurred on 27 April 2017, when about 200 Macedonian nationalists (some of whom were members and sympathizers of VMRO-DPMNE) stormed the Macedonian Parliament in reaction to the election of Talat Xhaferi, an ethnic Albanian, as Speaker of the Assembly of the Republic of Macedonia. It was the biggest attack in history on a Macedonian institution.

Background
In the years prior to the event, the Republic of Macedonia had been involved in political turmoil, culminating in mass anti-government protests in 2015 and 2016. These protests were the result of corruption allegations, which were the main cause of the Republic of Macedonia's political crisis, against VMRO-DPMNE leader Nikola Gruevski and his coalition partners. They were further accused of preventing the formation of a new government, following the parliamentary election in 2016, in order to avoid losing power and facing prosecution for corruption. 

The conflict also had ethnic undertones, as the reason no coalition government had been formed was due to the demand for the Albanian language to be the second official language in the Republic of Macedonia, and due to attempts by opposition leader Zoran Zaev to form a coalition government with Albanian ethnic parties. There had been daily protests across the country by supporters of the VMRO-DPMNE party in response to this. The Republic of Macedonia had seen mass ethnic violence in the previous years, particularly in 2001 and 2012.

Protests preceding the storming
Gruevski called for protests on 26 February with the words "all those who plan to sit at home and to watch TV believing that someone else will do their job to protect their country, are mistaken”, against the formation of a new coalition government. The protests began on 27 February, organized by the Macedonian nationalist association For a United Macedonia (claimed to be a proxy of VMRO-DPMNE), under the same slogan. Anti-Albanian slogans were heard during the protests. At the same time, around 20+ organizations named as "patriotic associations" were founded, which announced that they would use all kinds of violent and non-violent means to prevent "attempts to destroy the Republic of Macedonia". A rally held in Skopje was attended by prominent members and supporters of VMRO-DPMNE, as well as by heads of various state enterprises. Protesters were waving flags and placards reading ‘Freedom or Death’. Two journalists were attacked during the rally. Protests were held in other Macedonian cities as well.

Incident
The storming of the Parliament began at 7:00 p.m. After the end of the parliamentary session at 6:00 p.m which was chaired by the president from the previous parliamentary composition Trajko Veljanoski, the deputies from the parliamentary majority remained in the plenary hall to elect a new parliament president. Talat Xhaferi from the Democratic Union for Integration was elected as the new Speaker of the Assembly during the session. During the inauguration of Xhaferi, MPs from VMRO-DPMNE shouted that it was a "coup". 

Around 200 protesters, from "For a United Macedonia", stormed the parliament building after Xhaferi was elected speaker. They were protesting in front of the building prior to the storming. Many were masked and they threw chairs and punches at journalists and MPs, injuring SDSM leader Zoran Zaev and fellow MPs. Radmila Šekerinska, deputy head of the SDSM, required stitches after being dragged by her hair. MP from Alliance for the Albanians Ziadin Sela was severely attacked by several demonstrators, some of who dragged him on the floor and kicked him, while he was unconscious and covered in blood. 

The demonstrators faced little opposition from the outnumbered police stationed at the Parliament. The initially overwhelmed police responded later. Police had to deploy stun grenades to break up the mob. The demonstrators were expelled from the parliament building, while the lawmakers and journalists trapped inside the building were evacuated.

Reactions
The attack on the Parliament was strongly condemned by the international community. The violence was condemned by the European Union and NATO, who also greeted the election of Xhaferi as the new parliament speaker. 

SDSM accused VMRO-DPMNE of inciting violence and causing "hatred and division" among Macedonians. In a press conference, Zoran Zaev described the events as “attempted murder,” done with the consent of former Prime Minister Nikola Gruevski and the country’s former President Gjorge Ivanov.

Minister of Interior Agim Nuhiu condemned the attack on the Parliament and stated that the "persons in authority of the Ministry who are responsible for yesterday's events will be held accountable". He also stated that the Director of the Bureau of Public Security, Mitko Čavkov, had deliberately hindered police intervention, as well as that during the attack, Čavkov hadn’t been available on his phone for two hours.

A spokesman for the Democratic Union for Integration called the outbreak of violence "a sad day for Macedonia".

A spokesman for the human rights organization Council of Europe said the incident was “alarming”, while Albanian Prime Minister Edi Rama expressed concern over the “really dramatic” situation. Albania’s Foreign Ministry also said it was monitoring the "escalation" of violence in its neighbor, which it said was "unacceptable."

Aftermath
After the attack, on 30 April 15 people were already charged for "participation in a mob and preventing officials from performing their duties." On 2 May, Talat Xhaferi was blocked from entering his office by VMRO-DPMNE MPs until the next day, who considered his election invalid. Nationalist protests continued in the beginning of May. On 3 May, Interior Minister Nuhiu requested for the dismissal of Mitko Čavkov from the position of Director of the Bureau of Public Security. Additional people were charged, arrested and questioned regarding the events of 27 April. Video footage from security cameras inside the Parliament had captured VMRO-DPMNE MPs opening the doors and directing the assailants to the room where the MPs from the opposition and the journalists were. The Social-Democrat led-coalition government was also elected on 31 May, after much delay. After the resignation of Interior Minister Nuhiu, Oliver Spasovski took over the position on 1 June, under whom the investigation continued.

Trials
Trials were held against the participants and organizers of the attack.

A trial against nine individuals convicted for the violence that occurred in the Parliament ended with them receiving suspended sentences, which caused outrage. A spokesperson of SDSM has called the verdict “orchestrated, criminal, and shameful".

During one of the trials, state prosecutor Vilma Ruskovska stated, “The attack of the parliament on 27 April wasn’t a spontaneous attack of emotions, but a planned attack by the accused.” The trial was against around 30 people, including five VMRO-DPMNE MPs, and former interior minister Mitko Čavkov, among other government and security officials. They were charged with “terrorist endangerment of the constitutional order and security”. It ended with Former Director of the Bureau of Public Security Mitko Čavkov being sentenced to 18 years in prison, while police chiefs Mitko Pešov, Duško Lazarov, Goran Gjoševski were sentenced to 15 years in prison. Fifteen of the accused were granted an amnesty, which included the five MPs of VMRO-DPMNE and the organizers of "For a United Macedonia".

Former speaker of parliament Trajko Veljanoski was sentenced to six years and six months in prison, while former transport and labor ministers, Mile Janakieski and Spiro Ristovski, were sentenced to six years and three months in prison each. The former head of the secret police, Vladimir Atanasovski, was also sentenced to six years. They were all members of VMRO-DPMNE, found guilty of “terrorist endangerment of constitutional order”, as organizers of the storming.

Ministry of Interior and police oversights
In May 2017, 15 police officers and one person of authority in the Ministry were suspended. From the video material, it was established that the police officers passively observed the mob before and after they entered the Parliament, enabling their assault. In June, the Ministry of Interior published a report on the oversights by the Ministry and the police during the violence in the Macedonian Parliament. 23 police officers in total were suspended from work, and a disciplinary measure was initiated for 45. 11 police officers (due to inaction), security chiefs and 2 employees of the secret police (for tampering with evidence) were sacked in November 2017.

Protests demanding the release of people suspected and convicted of the attack
In November 2017 a protest was led by Gruevski against the arrest of people who were suspected of involvement in the attack, including his own MPs, Mitko Čavkov, and other former police employees. Gruevski was also accused of being involved in the attack, but he fled to Hungary where he has been granted asylum and has been living there since. A protest on 25 April 2021 was organized by Macedonian diaspora organizations and the families of the convicted people in front of the government and parliament building under the slogan "Democracy in Macedonia and freedom for the defenders of the constitution", demanding the release of people convicted for the attack, which was supported by VMRO-DPMNE and other smaller right-wing parties. High-ranking members and the leader of VMRO-DPMNE, Hristijan Mickoski, were also present in the protest, who wrote on social media: "We support and demand the release of the defenders of the constitution, they are not and cannot be terrorists. They are honest citizens of this country." The protest was criticized by Ziadin Sela and the ruling Social Democrats, saying that the opposition party “stands for the defense of crime and criminals.” A second protest was organized on 29 May, under the motto "Justice for the defenders of the constitution". The organizers of the protests claimed that the convictions were "politically motivated".

See also 

 List of attacks on legislatures

References

Modern history of North Macedonia 
2017 in the Republic of Macedonia
2017 riots
2017 protests 
Anti-Albanian sentiment
April 2017 crimes in Europe
Attacks on legislatures
Attacks on buildings and structures in 2017
Ethnic riots
Political riots 
Politics of North Macedonia 
Protests against results of elections
Electoral violence